Benton Township is an inactive township in Cedar County, in the U.S. state of Missouri.

Benton Township was established in the 1840s, taking the name of Thomas Hart Benton, a state legislator.

References

Townships in Missouri
Townships in Cedar County, Missouri